OSHC may refer to:

 Out of School Hours Care
 Overseas Student Health Cover